Colburn's tuco-tuco (Ctenomys colburni) is a species of rodent in the family Ctenomyidae. It is known only from Argentina.

References

Tuco-tucos
Mammals of Patagonia
Mammals of Argentina
Mammals of Chile
Mammals described in 1903
Taxonomy articles created by Polbot